Alvi Musayevich Adilkhanov (born 9 March 2003) is a Russian football player who plays as a central midfielder for FC Akhmat Grozny.

Club career
He made his debut in the Russian Premier League for FC Akhmat Grozny on 24 April 2021 in a game against FC Ural Yekaterinburg.

References

External links
 
 

2003 births
People from Gudermes
Sportspeople from Chechnya
Living people
Russian footballers
Association football midfielders
FC Akhmat Grozny players
Russian Premier League players